Dis/Location is the sixth studio album by American post-grunge band Seven Mary Three.  It was released on May 11, 2004 on DRT Entertainment.

The album's only single was "Without You Feels".

Track listing
All songs written by Jason Ross and Thomas Juliano, except where noted.

Personnel 
 Jason Ross – lead vocals, rhythm guitar
 Thomas Juliano – lead guitar, backing vocals
 Casey Daniel – bass
 Giti Khalsa – drums

Production
Producers – Jason Ross, Thomas Juliano, and Brian Paulson, except "Without You Feels" produced by Sylvia Massy, Jason Ross, and Thomas Juliano
Engineering – Brian Paulson, except "Without You Feels" engineered by Sylvia Massy
Mixing – Brian Paulson, except "Without You Feels" mixed by Sylvia Massy 
Mastering – UE Nastasi
Art Direction – Lane Wurster
Graphic Design – Phillip Dwyer
Photography – Michael Traister, Martin Bennett, and Sam Mitcham

References

2004 albums
Albums produced by Brian Paulson
Seven Mary Three albums